= DieHard 500 =

Two NASCAR races at Talladega Superspeedway have been called the DieHard 500:

- For the race from 1990 to 1997, see YellaWood 500
- For the race from 1998 to 2000, see GEICO 500
